Finsterworld is a 2013 German motion picture drama directed by Frauke Finsterwalder and co-written by Finsterwalder and Christian Kracht, starring Margit Carstensen, Sandra Hüller, Corinna Harfouch, Christoph Bach, Carla Juri, and Jakub Gierszał.

Plot
Finsterworld is an ensemble piece with twelve main characters who are gradually shown to interconnect with each other. These include a pedicurist, three generations of the Sandberg family, and a documentarist and her policeman boyfriend, who is secretly a furry.

Production and release
The film was shot at various locations in Bavaria and Tanzania.

Its world premiere was at the 2013 Montréal World Film Festival.

It opened in German cinemas in October 2013, in Austria in January 2014 and in Switzerland in March 2014.

Soundtrack
The film features an original score by composer Michaela Melián, singer of the German new wave band FSK, and is bookended by the song "The Wind" by Cat Stevens.

Critical response
The Hollywood Reporter praised its "sophisticated screenplay", "beautiful camerawork" and "very solid line-up of actors". Die Welt called it a "masterpiece", while Letterboxd writes "Somewhere between a sylvan paradise lost and a realpolitik nightmare come true lies Finsterworld's Germany. Its fantastical inhabitants feel so familiar, it's uncanny. They're neighbors, fathers and boys you went to school with. It hits too close to home. Perhaps we should bury that movie deep in the forest where nobody will ever find it. Or perhaps we should allow its haunting veracity to breathe."

Awards
It won the Bronze Zenith at the 2013 Montréal World Film Festival, as well as the 2013 TV-Spielfilm-Award at Germany’s Cologne Conference. At the 2013 Zurich Film Festival, it won the Critics' Choice award, and prize for the best German-language feature film. The film was nominated for best fiction debut at Camerimage festival in Poland. It has also garnered nominations for best feature film debut at Munich’s 2013 Filmfest München and three nominations for the 2013 Preis der deutschen Filmkritik, winning best German screenplay, as well as five nominations for the Deutscher Filmpreis, with Sandra Hüller winning best supporting actress. In 2014, it won best female directed film at Edinburgh International Film Festival, as well as a nomination for the Fipresci Prize at the Jerusalem Film Festival.

References

External links 
 

German drama films
2013 films
2010s German films
Furry fandom